Mario Astorri (7 August 1920 – 3 December 1989) was an Italian football player and coach, who played as a forward. He won the Danish Superliga twice, the first time while coaching AB Gladsaxe in 1967, and the second time while in charge of Kjøbenhavns Boldklub in 1974.

External links
Mario Astorri Profile on TuttoJuve.com

1920 births
1989 deaths
Italian footballers
Serie A players
Serie B players
Serie C players
S.P.A.L. players
Venezia F.C. players
Juventus F.C. players
Atalanta B.C. players
S.S.C. Napoli players
A.C. Monza players
Italian football managers
Akademisk Boldklub managers
Køge Boldklub managers
Holbæk B&I managers
Italian expatriate football managers
Expatriate football managers in Denmark
Association football midfielders
A.C. Meda 1913 managers
Hellerup IK managers